Powerex Corp. is the wholly owned energy marketing and trading subsidiary of BC Hydro. Powerex buys and sells wholesale electricity, natural gas and environmental energy products and services in Western North America (WECC). In business since 1988, Powerex Corp. is headquartered in Vancouver, British Columbia. Powerex also markets the Canadian Entitlement energy from the Columbia River Treaty.

See also

Alberta interdependence
Western Interconnection

References

External links
 

Energy companies of Canada
Companies based in Vancouver
BC Hydro